Elsie Euphemia Andrews  (23 December 1888 – 26 August 1948) was a New Zealand teacher and community leader.

She was born in Huirangi, Taranaki, New Zealand, on 23 December 1888. Her parents were John Andrews and his wife, Emily Young, who both came from Taranaki pioneering families. Elsie Andrews was the only one of twelve siblings who attended secondary school; she received her education at Huirangi School and with the help of a scholarship, she went on to New Plymouth High School. When she failed entrance examinations to both university and teachers' college, she became a pupil-teacher at Waitara School. After completing her training, she moved around various rural schools before getting a permanent position at New Plymouth's Fitzroy School.

In the 1938 King's Birthday Honours, Andrews was appointed a Member of the Order of the British Empire.

Andrews died on 26 August 1948 at New Plymouth, having never married.

References

Additional reading

External links
Photos of the three female candidates in the 

1888 births
1948 deaths
New Zealand educators
Unsuccessful candidates in the 1935 New Zealand general election
New Zealand conscientious objectors
New Zealand Members of the Order of the British Empire